TAROM is a Romanian airline.

Tarom may also refer to:

Places

Populated places
Tarom, Chaharmahal and Bakhtiari, a village in Iran
Tarom, East Azerbaijan, a village in Iran
Tarom, Hormozgan, a village in Iran
Tarom, Lorestan, a village in Iran
Tarom, Tehran, a village in Iran
Tarom Dasht, a village in Iran

Administrative subdivisions
Tarom County, Iran
Tarom Rural District, Iran
Tarom Sofla District, Iran